Grand Canyonscope is a Donald Duck animated short released in 1954. It was Disney's second cartoon filmed in CinemaScope (following Toot, Whistle, Plunk and Boom), and was produced to accompany Disney's first CinemaScope film 20,000 Leagues Under the Sea. (One joke has J. Audubon Woodlore breaking the fourth wall stating to the tourists in the CinemaScope version, "Uh, spread out, folks, this is CinemaScope." or in the flat version, "Uh, spread out, folks, this is a big canyon.")

Plot
Donald is taking a tour of the Grand Canyon. Although he just wants to enjoy the whole exhibition, this is made all but impossible by the constant admonishment from the rulebook-wielding tour guide: none other than Ranger J. Audubon Woodlore. Donald and Woodlore continue to irritate each other — Donald by innocently tripping over various regulations ("Don't drop rocks into the canyon; Don't bother the native Americans; Don't yell at Echo Cliff"; You can't be on the tour without a burro to ride"; et al.), and Woodlore by chastising him for it — until Woodlore himself disturbs Louie the Mountain Lion... the last lion seen in these parts since the Civil War.

To Woodlore's shock, Louie is, in fact, the same lion! He precedes to don a Confederate soldier's hat and gives chase (after Woodlore's failure to gain his confidence by whistling the Confederate tune Dixie). Woodlore is caught in the middle as Louie chases Donald through the Canyon, which results in most of it being destroyed (notably, a number of natural rock formations are smashed).

With all the other tourists having fled, Woodlore sternly — and rather insultingly — demands that both Donald and the lion must restore Grand Canyon to its original state that they ruined; accordingly, he passes them a couple of shovels and yells at them to start digging. Feeling extremely remorseful, Donald and Louie are actually crazy enough to go along with this; they mopingly begin the ponderous task of restoring the Grand Canyon to its former glory.

Voice cast
 Donald Duck: Clarence Nash
 J. Audubon Woodlore: Bill Thompson
 Louie the Mountain Lion: James MacDonald

Home media
The short was remastered and also released on November 11, 2008, on Walt Disney Treasures: The Chronological Donald, Volume Four: 1951–1961.

It was also released as a bonus feature on the DVD release of 20,000 Leagues Under the Sea.

See also
 List of Disney animated shorts
 Donald Duck filmography

References

External links
 

1954 films
1954 animated films
Donald Duck short films
1950s Disney animated short films
Films set in Arizona
Films produced by Walt Disney
Films scored by Oliver Wallace
Films directed by Charles August Nichols
American Civil War films
CinemaScope films
Grand Canyon in fiction
Works about the Grand Canyon
1950s English-language films
Films about cougars